Carl-Johan Lerby is a Swedish ice hockey defenceman who plays for the Malmö Redhawks of the SHL, where he made his senior level debut in 2016.

He spent one season with Stockton Heat, the AHL affiliate of the Calgary Flames.

Career statistics

References

External links

1997 births
Living people
Malmö Redhawks players
Stockton Heat players
People from Trelleborg
Swedish ice hockey defencemen
Sportspeople from Skåne County